Episomini is a weevil tribe in the subfamily Entiminae.

Genera 
Bethaeus – Catamonas – Ceratocrates – Chaunoderus – Demenica – Epilaris – Episomus – Lachnotarsus – Parapionus – Platyomicus

References 

 Lacordaire, T. 1863: Histoire Naturelle des Insectes. Genera des Coléoptères ou exposé méthodique et critique de tous les genres proposés jusqu'ici dans cet ordre d'insectes. Vol.: 6. Roret. Paris: 637 pp.

External links 

Entiminae